"Pearly-Dewdrops' Drops" is a single by Scottish band Cocteau Twins, taken from their 1984 EP The Spangle Maker. The song was written by Cocteau Twins, and recorded at Rooster Studios in London. It was their highest-charting single, peaking at No. 29 on the UK Singles Chart and No. 1 on the UK Indie Chart.

Release and promotion
During the song's early weeks of release, it quickly become a prominent feature on European radio stations. In the United Kingdom, across all BBC radio stations and other broadcasters such as Capital Radio, "Pearly-Dewdrops' Drops" was the 12th most frequently played song on British radio stations.

In the week of May 14, 1984, "Pearly-Dewdrops' Drops" debuted at No. 53 on the European Airplay Top 60 chart, a chart compiled across Europe based on information received from individual European countries relating to radio airplay.

Music video
A music video for the song, directed by Nigel Grierson of 23 Envelope, was filmed at The Chapel in Holloway Sanatorium in Virginia Water, and in nearby Virginia Waters Park.

The music video was released and serviced to European television channels for broadcast. On the European continent itself, the music video received minimal airplay. However, in the United Kingdom, the music video for the song received considerable broadcast time. On the European music channel Music Box, the video was ranked amongst the top ten videos to be played in May 1984.

In popular culture
The song was used on the soundtrack of the 2012 film The Perks of Being a Wallflower.

The song was used in the final scene of the 2021 Netflix miniseries Halston.

Charts

References

1984 debut singles
1984 songs
Cocteau Twins songs
4AD singles
UK Independent Singles Chart number-one singles